In June 2018, Ireland played a three-test series against Australia as part of the 2018 June rugby union tests. It was the first time Ireland had played a test series against Australia in Australia since 2010. The series was part of the sixth year of the global rugby calendar established by World Rugby, which runs through to 2019.

Fixtures

Squads
Note: Ages, caps and clubs are as per 9 June, the first test match of the tour.

Ireland
On 23 May 2018, Joe Schmidt named a 32-man squad for the 2018 June rugby union tests.

On 31 May, tour captain Rory Best was ruled out of the test series with a hamstring injury. Munster's Niall Scannell was called-up to replace him, with Peter O'Mahony and Johnny Sexton sharing the captaincy duties for the tour.

Dave Kilcoyne trained with the squad as injury cover for Cian Healy ahead of the third test, whilst Will Addison also trained with the team, though neither player was officially added to the touring squad.

Coaching team:
 Head coach:  Joe Schmidt
 Defence coach:  Andy Farrell
 Forwards coach:  Simon Easterby
 Scrum coach:  Greg Feek

Australia
On 30 May 2018, Michael Cheika named a 32-man squad for the three-test series against Ireland.

On 3 June, Pete Samu was added to the squad after New Zealand Rugby agreed to release the flanker, who plays for Crusaders in New Zealand, for the test series. On the same day however, hooker Jordan Uelese was ruled out of the series with a knee injury sustained playing for Melbourne Rebels. Tolu Latu was called-up to the squad to replace Uelese.

On 18 June, Jake Gordon was called-up to replace the injured Will Genia.

Coaching team:
 Head coach:  Michael Cheika
 Attack coach:  Stephen Larkham
 Forwards coach:  Simon Raiwalui
 Defence coach:  Nathan Grey

Matches

First Test

Notes:
 Brandon Paenga-Amosa, Pete Samu and Caleb Timu (all Australia) made their international debuts.

Second Test

Notes:
 Tadhg Beirne (Ireland) made his international debut.
 This was Ireland's first win against Australia in Australia since their 9–3 victory in Sydney in 1979.

Third Test

Notes:
 Peter O'Mahony and Jack McGrath (both Ireland) won their 50th test caps.
 This was Ireland's first series victory against Australia since 1979, whilst Ireland also retained the Lansdowne Cup.

Statistics
Key
Con: Conversions
Pen: Penalties
DG: Drop goals
Pts: Points

Ireland statistics

Test series statistics

See also
 2018 June rugby union tests
 History of rugby union matches between Australia and Ireland

References

2017–18 in Irish rugby union
2018 in Australian rugby union
2018 rugby union tours
2018
2018